"Dirty Water" is a 1966 single by The Standells.

Dirty Water may also refer to:

Dirty Water (album), a 1966 album by The Standells
Dirty Water Club, a London garage rock nightclub
"Dirty Water" (The Blackeyed Susans song), a 1994 single by The Blackeyed Susans
"Dirty Water", a 1987 single by Rock & Hyde
"Dirty Water", a 2000 single by Made in London
"Dirty Water", a song by Status Quo from the 1977 album Rockin' All Over the World
"Dirty Water", a song by The Smith Street Band from the 2020 album Don't Waste Your Anger

See also
 Blackwater (waste)
 Gray water